This is a list of Members of Parliament elected in the 1933 Northern Ireland general election. Elections to the 4th Northern Ireland House of Commons were held on 30 November 1933.

All members of the Northern Ireland House of Commons elected at the 1933 Northern Ireland general election are listed.

Members

Changes
1933: Robert McNeill began taking the Unionist whip.
1934: Jack Beattie expelled from the Northern Ireland Labour Party, and sat as an independent Labour member.
4 June 1934: Thomas Joseph Campbell elected for the Nationalists in Belfast Central, following the death of Joseph Devlin.
22 March 1935: Arthur Brownlow Mitchell elected for the Unionists in Queen's University of Belfast, following the resignation of Robert McNeill.
2 April 1937: Frederick Thompson elected for the Unionists in Belfast Ballynafeigh, following the death of Thomas Moles.
7 May 1937: Patrick Maxwell elected for the Nationalists in Foyle, following the death of James Joseph McCarroll.
27 May 1937: Harold Claude Robinson elected for the Unionists in Larne, following the resignation of George Boyle Hanna.
2 February 1938: Death of Patrick O'Neill.  His seat remained unfilled at the time of the general election.

References
Biographies of Members of the Northern Ireland House of Commons

1929